The Partnership Council is a Joint Committee established upon  provisional application of the EU–UK Trade and Cooperation Agreement. It has several governing tasks within the TCA and supplementing agreements between the UK and the EU (Articles 2 and 7.2). Each party to the agreement can refer to the Council any issue relating to the implementation, application and interpretation of the TCA. The council has – in the first years – the power to amend certain parts of the TCA "provided that such amendments are necessary to correct errors, or to address omissions or other deficiencies", and has the ability to delegate certain of its powers to the Trade Partnership Committee or to a Specialised Committee.

The Council comprises representatives of the EU and of the UK, and is co-chaired by a member of the European Commission and a ministerial-level representative of the UK government. The draft EU Council decision on the signature of the TCA provides for the right of each member state to be represented in Partnership Council meetings as part of the EU delegation. It meets at the request of the EU or the UK, and at least once a year, with the agenda set by mutual consent. The council is separate from the conflict handling mechanism through an arbitration procedure

Agreements covered by the Council
The council has a role in the TCA and other "supplementing agreements", unless otherwise provided. The agreements in which a role for the council is established are shown below:

Schema of the EU-UK institutional framework

Secretariat 
The Secretariat will be composed of an official of the EU and an official of the Government of the UK. It will perform the tasks conferred in the Rules of Procedure; in particular, it will take care of the administrative tasks such as correspondence between the EU and UK, agendas and minutes. The official languages will be the official languages of the EU and the UK; the working language will be English.

Committees and Working Groups 
Articles 8 and 9 establish 16 committees and 4 Working groups. Together with the council itself and its secretariat the following (sub)organisations exist. 
 Partnership Council
 Secretariat of the Partnership Council
 Trade Partnership Committee
 Trade Specialised Committee on Goods
 Trade Specialised Committee on Customs Cooperation and Rules of Origin
 Trade Specialised Committee on Sanitary and Phytosanitary Measures
 Trade Specialised Committee on Technical Barriers to Trade
 Working Group on Organic Products
 Working Group on Motor Vehicles and Parts
 Working Group on Medicinal Products
 Trade Specialised Committee on Services, Investment and Digital Trade
 Trade Specialised Committee on Public Procurement
 Trade Specialised Committee on Regulatory Cooperation
 Trade Specialised Committee on Administrative Cooperation in VAT and Recovery of Taxes and Duties
 Specialised Committee on Energy
 Specialised Committee on Air Transport
 Specialised Committee on Road Transport
 Specialised Committee on Social Security Coordination
 Working Group on Social Security Coordination
 Specialised Committee on Fisheries
 Specialised Committee on Law Enforcement and Judicial Cooperation
 Specialised Committee on Participation in Union Programmes

Other possible bodies 
The following organisations may be established based on the institutional framework:
 EU–UK Parliamentary Partnership Assembly
 Civil Society Forum

Functioning 
As of September 2022, 3 decisions of the Partnership Council and 1 of a specialized committee have been published. The first one was the extension of the final date of provisional application of the Trade and Cooperation agreement to 30 April 2021.

See also 
 European Court of Justice

References

External links 
 Meeting page of the EU-UK institutions set up under the Trade and Cooperation Agreement

EU–UK Trade and Cooperation Agreement
Brexit
UK